Chakwara is a patwar circle and village in Phagi Tehsil in Jaipur district, Rajasthan.

In Chakwara, there are 484 households with total population of 3,824 (with 52.28% males and 47.72% females), based on 2011 census. Total area of village is 23.91 km2.  There are 2 primary schools and one post office in Chakwara village.

References

Villages in Jaipur district